The Better Woman is a 2019 Philippine drama television series broadcast by GMA Network. It premiered on the network's Telebabad line up and worldwide on GMA Pinoy TV on July 1, 2019, replacing Kara Mia in Sahaya's timeslot.

Originally it was supposed to replace Kara Mia in its timeslot, but due to its mature theme, it was bumped off to the 2nd slot, moving Sahaya to the 1st slot.

Series overview

Episodes

July 2019

August 2019

September 2019

References

Lists of Philippine drama television series episodes